Clifford Ragsdale Hope (June 9, 1893 – May 16, 1970) was a U.S. Representative from Kansas, and a member of the Republican Party. Born in Birmingham, Iowa, Hope attended  public schools and Nebraska Wesleyan University, in Lincoln, Nebraska. He served during the First World War, as a second lieutenant. He served in the Kansas House of Representatives. He was elected to the Seventieth United States Congress in 1927 and served in Congress through 1957, making him the longest-serving Kansan in the United States House of Representatives.

After leaving office, Hope served as President of Great Plains Wheat Inc. of Garden City, Kansas from 1959 to 1963. He died as a result of a stroke on May 16, 1970.

References

External links
 

1893 births
1970 deaths
Republican Party members of the Kansas House of Representatives
People from Birmingham, Iowa
People from Garden City, Kansas
Nebraska Wesleyan University alumni
United States Army personnel of World War I
Republican Party members of the United States House of Representatives from Kansas
20th-century American politicians